NVC community M23 (Juncus effusus'/acutiflorus - Galium palustre rush-pasture) is one of the mire communities in the British National Vegetation Classification system.

It is a community that can be found in the Purple Moor and Rush pasture BAP habitat in England.

Community composition

Constant species are:

 Galium palustre (Common Marsh Bedstraw)
 Holcus lanatus (Yorkshire Fog)
 Juncus effusus (Soft Rush)
 Juncus acutiflorus (Sharp flowered rush)
 Lotus pedunculatus  (Greater birds foot trefoil)

Distribution

This community can be found in England.

Subcommunities

There are two subcommunities: a, Juncus acutiflorus and b, Juncus effusus.

References

 Rodwell, J. S. (1991) British Plant Communities Volume 2 - Mires and heaths  (hardback),  (paperback)

M23